Pharsalia malasiaca is a species of beetle in the family Cerambycidae. It was described by James Thomson in 1864. It is known from Sumatra, Borneo and Malaysia.

References

malasiaca
Beetles described in 1864